The Community Development Council (CDC; ;) is a government-led organisation to organise grassroot organisations and community programmes into smaller, local units as a bridge between the government and the community in Singapore. It encourages volunteerism from wider community, and organises community and social assistance programs with the help of a monetary grant from the government. They are governed by the Community Development Council Rules 1997.

Organisation
There are currently five Community Development Councils as of 27 July 2020:

The council boundaries follow that of the existing political divisions, with each handling between four and six GRCs and SMCs and roughly dividing the country's population into equal parts. Each CDC is managed by a Council, which in turn is headed by an appointed mayor and has between 12 and 80 members. The members are appointed by the chairman or deputy chairman of the People's Association.

Mayors 

In 2021, during the parliamentary debate on Budget 2021, Leader of the Opposition Pritam Singh questioned the amount of salaries paid to the mayors and whether is there a need of full-time CDC mayors. Central Singapore CDC's mayor, Denise Phua, replied that she is the only full-time CDC mayor while the rest are considered part-time mayors.

Funding
The CDCs are funded by an annual sum from the government directly proportionate to the number of residents living within their jurisdiction at a rate of S$1 per person. They are free to conduct their own fund-raising programs, which the government will match S$3 for every S$1 raised, up to a cap of S$40 million a year from 2018 financial year. Previously, the cap was S$24 million a year. The government also pays for the councils' operational costs, including that for its offices.

References

External links
Official site

Singapore government policies
 Community Development Council
2001 establishments in Singapore